Elena-Marie Bey is an American paralympic swimmer.

She competed at the 1976 Summer Paralympics, winning four gold, a silver and a bronze medal.

References 

American female swimmers
20th-century American women
Paralympic swimmers of the United States
Swimmers at the 1976 Summer Paralympics
Medalists at the 1976 Summer Paralympics
Paralympic gold medalists for the United States
Paralympic silver medalists for the United States
Paralympic bronze medalists for the United States
Paralympic medalists in swimming